The Winstanley School is a coeducational secondary school located in Braunstone in the English county of Leicestershire.

The school specialises in sports, and a range of sporting and community facilities have been developed to support the specialism.

The school celebrated its 50th anniversary in 2012, along with the celebration of the Olympics that year. The school also converted to academy status in 2012. A painting was painted by an Art Teacher and students.

Previously, The Winstanley School was a middle school educating pupils aged 11 to 14 (academic years 7 to 9). However, from September 2014 the school expanded to be a full secondary school educating pupils up to the age of 16. The school was formerly known as Winstanley Community College.

References

External links
 Official Winstanley School Website

Secondary schools in Leicestershire
Educational institutions established in 1962
1962 establishments in England
Academies in Leicestershire